Juan Carlos Higuero Mate (born 3 August 1978) is a Spanish middle distance runner, who mostly concentrates on the 1500 metres. He was born in Aranda de Duero, Burgos.

At the 2006 European Championships in Athletics Higuero won two bronze medals, over 1500 and 5000 metres. It was his international major event debut in the 5000 metres. He already had two silver medals from the European Indoor Championships.

Achievements

Personal bests
800 metres - 1:45.87 min (2007)
1500 metres - 3:31.57 min (2006)
Mile - 3:52.49 min (2002)
3000 metres - 7:59.76 min (1999)
5000 metres - 13:33.65 min (2006)

External links

Spanish Olympic Committee

1978 births
Living people
Spanish male middle-distance runners
Athletes (track and field) at the 2000 Summer Olympics
Athletes (track and field) at the 2004 Summer Olympics
Athletes (track and field) at the 2008 Summer Olympics
Olympic athletes of Spain
European Athletics Championships medalists
Sportspeople from the Province of Burgos
21st-century Spanish people